The Harvard Bridge (also known locally as the MIT Bridge, the Massachusetts Avenue Bridge, and the "Mass. Ave." Bridge) is a steel haunched girder bridge  carrying Massachusetts Avenue (Route 2A) over the Charles River and connecting Back Bay, Boston with Cambridge, Massachusetts.

After years of disagreement between the cities of Boston and Cambridge, the bridge was built jointly by the two cities between 1887 and 1891. It was  named for Harvard University founder John Harvard. Originally equipped with a central swing span, it was revised several times over the years until its superstructure was completely replaced in the late 1980s due to unacceptable vibration and the collapse of a similar bridge in Connecticut.

The bridge is known locally for being marked off in the idiosyncratic unit of length called the smoot.

Conception
In 1874 the Massachusetts Legislature authorized construction of a bridge between Boston and Cambridge, and in 1882 follow-up legislation set out its location.

The bridge was to have a draw with an opening of at least .  Boston interests opposed the bridge, mainly because it did not provide for an overhead crossing of the Grand Junction Branch of the Boston and Albany Railroad. Further legislation in 1885 changed the draw to a clear opening of at least  and no more, until the other bridges below the proposed location were required to have a larger opening.  There was still no substantive progress until 1887, when Cambridge petitioned the Legislature to compel Boston to proceed; the resulting act required each city pay half the cost, and allowed Boston to raise up to $250,000 (US$ with inflation) for this purpose, in excess of its debt limit. This implied an estimated cost of US$500,000 (US$ with inflation) for the bridge.

The Legislature provided for a bridge commission, to consist of the mayors of Boston and Cambridge plus a third commissioner to be appointed by the mayors. The mayors of Boston and Cambridge, Hugh O'Brien and William E. Russell, appointed Leander Greeley of Cambridge as the third commissioner, though this appointment changed over time.

The commission's 1892 report claimed:

Name
The bridge is named for the Reverend John Harvard, for whom Harvard University is also named, rather than for the university itself. Other names suggested included Blaxton, Chester, Shawmut, and Longfellow.

Engineering

Originally projected as a wooden pile structure with stone pavement for the first  (because the Charles River Embankment extension was expected to take that space) the design was changed to be entirely iron spans on stone piers.  The general plans were approved on July 14, 1887.  The engineers were William Jackson (Boston City Engineer), John E. Cheney (assistant Boston City Engineer), Samuel E. Tinkham (assistant engineer), and Nathan S. Brock (assistant engineer at bridge).

The subsurface conditions at the bridge location are extreme. Much of Boston is underlain with clay, but the situation at the bridge is exacerbated by a fault which roughly follows the path of the Charles River itself. Over this are thin layers of sand, gravel, and fill.

The substructure originally consisted of two masonry abutments and twenty-three masonry piers, as well as one pile foundation with a fender pier for the draw span.  The superstructure was originally twenty-three cantilevered fixed spans and suspended spans, of plate girders with one swing span.  The Boston abutment rests on vertical piles, while the Cambridge end is directly on gravel.

Originally, the bridge was built across the Charles River connecting West Chester Park, in Boston, with Front Street, in Cambridge. This is now called Massachusetts Avenue on both sides of the river. The width of the bridge was  except near and on the draw.

The longer spans were cantilevered, while the shorter spans were suspended between the cantilevers.

There were also two  sidewalks.

It was a double-cantilevered, electrically-driven structure also carrying a bridge caretaker's house.

The bridge opened on September 1, 1891.  The original cost of construction was $511,000, $ in current dollars.

Maintenance and events

In 1898,  bicycle lanes were installed next to each curb.  In 2011 (113 years later), the City of Boston finally connected these lanes to its own bike lanes.

A marker near the southeast end of the bridge memorializes one of Harry Houdini's "well known escapes", during which he jumped from the bridge on May 1, 1908. (Other sources give the date as April 30, 1908.)

The bridge was declared unsafe in 1909, requiring all of the iron and steel to be replaced.  The draw was elevated slightly and the trolley rails were replaced as well.

When the Metropolitan District Commission (MDC) took control of the bridge in 1924, they rebuilt much of the bridge superstructure.  They replaced the wooden stringers with steel "I" beams, topped wooden deck elements with concrete and brick, and replaced the street car rails.  Structural steel hangers replaced wrought iron.  The swing span was converted into two  fixed spans the same width as the rest of the bridge.  The wooden pier was heavily modified with concrete and stone to make it resemble the other piers, increasing the number of stone piers from 23 to 24.

Heavy traffic at the Mass Ave and Memorial Drive intersection on the Cambridge end of the bridge led to the construction of an underpass in 1931.

The bridge was formerly referred to as the "Xylophone Bridge" because of the sound its wooden decking made when traffic traveled over it. At this time, all bearings were replaced, and the trolley car tracks were removed, as were granite blocks. The trolley car poles were reused for street lights. Ramps between the bridge and the under-construction Storrow Drive were added.

The 1924 sidewalk slabs were replaced by precast, prestressed slabs in 1962.  The fifteen expansion dams were replaced or repaired in 1969.

Engineering study, 1971–1972

An engineering study was performed by the Metropolitan District Commission (later merged into the Department of Conservation and Recreation) in 1971–1972 due to complaints by bridge users of excessive vibration. The bridge was found to be understrength for its load. A  limit was imposed.

Suggestions made included strengthening the existing structure by adding either struts or plates to make the existing four beams along the length of the bridge into a stiffening truss, or to replace the superstructure with a new one, made of either steel or concrete, which would be up to current standards.  The recommendation was to replace the superstructure with one weighing approximately the same in order to reuse the piers, which were in good condition.

The reasoning was that the cost of a new structure could be predicted much more easily than the cost of repairing and reinforcing the existing bridge.  The resulting new bridge would be of known materials and quality, such as ductile structural steel rather than brittle wrought iron, and rated at AASHO HS-20.  Repairing the existing structure would leave old wrought iron of uncertain quality and condition standing, and would not bring the design up to (then) current standards.  Detailed engineering calculations were included.  The price was estimated at US$2.5 million to US$3 million (US$ to US$ with inflation).

The action taken based on this study was to establish load restrictions on the bridge,  in the outer lanes,  on the inner lanes.

Superstructure replacement, 1980s
After the failure of the Mianus River Bridge at Greenwich, Connecticut in 1983, the Harvard Bridge was shut down and inspected because it contained similar elements, specifically the suspended spans.  Traffic was restricted to the inner two lanes due to the discovery of two failed hangers on span 14.  A few days later, all trucks and buses were banned from the bridge.

In 1986, a report was published containing the plan to replace the superstructure on the existing supports.  Alternatives considered were very similar to the 1972 report, and were similarly decided.  Structural modifications included an upgrade from four longitudinal girders to six of the same shape and replacement of a stairway with a handicapped pedestrian ramp on the Boston end of the bridge.

Ramp "B", from southbound (Boston bound) bridge lanes to eastbound Storrow Drive, caused traffic to merge onto Storrow Drive from the left (high speed) lanes using a short acceleration lane, causing safety issues.  The MDC requested elimination of this ramp.  Compared to overall bridge traffic of 30,000 vehicles per day, traffic on ramp B was found to be low, approximately 1,500 vehicles per day with a peak of 120 vehicles per hour.

The historic value of the bridge was considered significant, so the plan was to make the replacement superstructure appear similar, with similar railing and lighting.  In order to document the pre-existing structure, a Historic American Engineering Record (HAER) would be prepared.

Pier 12 was exhibiting inappropriate movement and was scheduled for reinforcement.

The work would be done in two phases.  Phase 1 would reinforce the downstream side of the bridge to allow MBTA bus traffic, and was expected to take 5 months.  Most of this effort would be spent on the underside of the bridge and would not affect existing traffic.  Phase 2 would replace the entire superstructure and was expected to take three construction seasons to implement.  Cost was estimated to be  (US$ with inflation).  Phase 1 finished in 1987, and Phase 2 in 1990.

Subsequent events
In the fall of 2014, the Charles River Conservancy announced that an anonymous donor would fund an upgrade of the street lights for both the roadway and both sidewalks on the bridge. The new roadway and aesthetic lighting was installed in 2015, highlighting the smoot marks along the sidewalk. The design was selected after a competition won by Miguel Rosales of Rosales + Partners.
"It will provide safe lighting for pedestrians and drivers, and the elements of design on the bridge will be pulled out and emphasized. It will become a really beautiful bridge," said Renata von Tscharner, founder and president of the Charles River Conservancy.

Smoots

The Harvard Bridge is marked off in an idiosyncratic unit of measure, the smoot.

In 1958, members of the Lambda Chi Alpha fraternity at MIT measured the bridge's eastern sidewalk by using that year's shortest pledge, Oliver Smootnominally,  tallas a measuring stick. Years after this stunt, Smoot became president of the American National Standards Institute (ANSI), and later president of the International Organization for Standardization (ISO).

Markers painted at  intervals give the bridge's length 364.4 smoots long, "plus one ear". Originally this read "plus or minus one ear"representing measurement uncertaintybut over the years the words "or minus" disappeared.  The marks are repainted twice each year by members of the fraternityoriginally surreptitiously and later openly.

During the major reconstruction in the 1980s, the new sidewalks were divided into smoot-length slabs rather than the standard six feet, and the smoot markings were painted on the new deck.  Officials' original determination to omit the smoot markings from the reconstructed bridge, and to scrupulously prevent the fraternity from repainting them, evaporated when it was realized that police routinely used the smoot marks as reference points in accident reports.

A possible cause is that in 1958, there were ramps to Storrow Drive on both sides of the bridge, which interrupted the sidewalk earlier than it extends today. A bridge of  corresponds to 387.7 smoots ± one ear.

See also
List of bridges documented by the Historic American Engineering Record in Massachusetts
List of crossings of the Charles River

References
Informational notes

Citations

Bibliography
 (Nationalbridges.com):  Note: this is a formatted scrape of the 2009 official website, which can be found here for Massachusetts: 
 
 
 (Replacement):  Submitted pursuant to 42 U.S.C. 4332 (2) (c), and 23 U.S.C. 128 (a).

External links

 
 1895 photo

Bridges completed in 1891
Bridges in Boston
Historic American Engineering Record in Massachusetts
Landmarks in Back Bay, Boston
Landmarks in Cambridge, Massachusetts
Massachusetts Institute of Technology
Massachusetts Institute of Technology student life
Buildings and structures in Cambridge, Massachusetts
Transportation in Cambridge, Massachusetts
Bridges in Middlesex County, Massachusetts
Road bridges in Massachusetts
1891 establishments in Massachusetts
Bridges over the Charles River
Steel bridges in the United States
Girder bridges in the United States